Baseri Aqajan (also Romanized as Bāşerī Āqājān and Bāserī Āqājān) is a village in Dezhkord Rural District, Sedeh District, Eqlid County, Fars Province, Iran. At the 2006 census, its population was 142, in 37 families.

References 

Populated places in Eqlid County